Geoffrey Feni Ogwaro, sometimes called Jeff Ogwaro, is a Ugandan gay man and gay human rights activist. He has worked as a co-coordinator of the Civil Society Coalition on Human Rights and Constitutional Law and teaching assistant at Makerere University.

Activism
Ogwaro, as a young gay man started fighting for gay rights when he got a chance to work for a human rights organization. His name appeared on the front page of the Mar. 1 issue of Red Pepper as a gay man, a few days after the Ugandan president Yoweri Museveni signed the anti-gay law. Ogwaro has worked on several LGBT activism projects with Sexual Minorities Uganda, Refugee Law Project and at the Center for Human Rights.

Education
Ogwaro attended Makerere University School of Law where he taught as a teaching assistant soon after his graduation. He earned his masters in Human Rights and Democracy from the University of Pretoria in 2015.

Recognition and awards
In 2012, Ogwaro, along with other Ugandan LGBT and Human Rights activists, were recognized by the then-US Secretary of State Hillary Clinton for their work in opposing the draft law that called a death penalty for LGBT people. Ogwaro was runner up for the Human Rights and Democracy through Photography Competition at the Center for Human Rights, University of Pretoria.

See also
Stella Nyanzi
Frank Mugisha
Pepe Julian Onziema

References

Ugandan LGBT rights activists
Ugandan gay men
Ugandan human rights activists
Living people
Year of birth missing (living people)
Ugandan activists
21st-century Ugandan LGBT people